José Gil de Castro y Morales (1 September 1785 – c. 1840/41) was an Afro-Peruvian portrait painter, cartographer and soldier who spent many years in Chile.

Biography 
He was born in Lima; his parents were free citizens. His first studies were with Julián Jayo (?-1821) in Trujillo, while he was stationed there as an officer in the colonial militia. When he returned to Lima, he was apprenticed to José del Pozo.

Somewhere between 1805 and 1808, he moved to Chile, where he opened a studio and established his reputation as a portrait painter. He was familiarly known as "El Mulato Gil". In 1816, he was appointed Grand Master of the Guild of Painters. He was placed in charge of making maps, a trade he had practiced earlier in Peru. In 1817, he was married in Santiago and became a Captain in the Rifle Battalion. He also built a house in the Barrio Lastarria and was named one of the first members of the Legion of Merit of Chile. His home and the surrounding grounds are now part of the Plaza Mulato Gil de Castro.

Thanks to his reputation as a portrait painter, he travelled extensively throughout Chile and Argentina, working on commissions from notable public figures. A distinguishing characteristic of his work is the text relating to his subject, placed on a banner, plaque or other device, that he included on many of his canvases. In 1820, he became a cartographer for the new Chilean government, but returned to Peru, probably in 1825, and was appointed an official government painter. One of his most notable portraits, and one of the few that doesn't depict a member of the upper classes, is the one of José Olaya, a fisherman who became a hero of the Peruvian War of Independence. 

Although his birthdate can be ascertained from baptismal records, his date and place of death are unknown. Later sources, from the 1870s, say he died at the age of sixty-five, although his death has been placed from 1839 to 1850. The Chilean writer , in his novel Cosa Mentale (A Mental Thing, 1992), attempts to recreate the painter's life, in a fantastical  manner.

Brief biographies online

Further reading 
 Magdalena Correa, José Gil de Castro (juvenile biography), Penguin Random House Grupo Editorial Chile, 2011 
 Patricia Mondoñedo Murillo, El Retrato de José Olaya: La Obra Disímil de José Gil de Castro, Seminario de Historia Rural Andina, Universidad Nacional Mayor de San Marcos, 2002

External links 

 "Gil de Castro, Painter of Latin American Independence Movement, Gets a Fresh Look in New Getty-Supported Publication" @ the Getty Iris

Peruvian painters
Peruvian male painters
1785 births
1841 deaths
People from Lima
Portrait painters